May River High School is a public high school within the Beaufort County School District, located in Bluffton, South Carolina, United States. The school was opened in 2016 as a reliever to neighboring Bluffton High School, as a result of new growth and development. The school district is the southernmost district in Beaufort County. A larger K–12 campus is being constructed in the area.

Athletics
May River High School competes at the Class AAAA level in the South Carolina High School League, moving up from their previous AAA classification in 2020. The school fields teams for boys in football, wrestling, basketball, swimming, cross country, track & field, tennis, golf, soccer, and lacrosse; and for girls in cheerleading, volleyball, basketball, swimming, cross country, soccer, track & field, tennis, and golf.

May River is a rival of Bluffton High School.

State Championships:

2019 Boys' Soccer

2019 Boys' Track & Field

2019 Boys' Cross Country

2020 Girls' Golf

2021 Girls’ Golf

See also
 Beaufort County School District

References

External links
 School website

2016 establishments in South Carolina
Schools in Beaufort County, South Carolina
Educational institutions established in 2016
Public high schools in South Carolina
Buildings and structures in Bluffton, South Carolina